Palpita austrounionalis is a moth in the family Crambidae. It was described by Inoue in 1997. It is found in Papua New Guinea, Australia and New Caledonia, where it has been recorded from the Northern Territory.

References

Moths described in 1997
Palpita
Moths of New Guinea
Moths of Australia